Lirian may refer to:
 Lirian, Khomeyn
 Lirian, Mahallat